Laurich is a surname. Notable people with the surname include:

 Hildegard Laurich (1941–2009), German contralto
 Tom Laurich (born 1980), Australian rower